Robinson Ekspeditionen 2022 is the twenty-third season of the Danish reality television series Robinson Ekspeditionen. Jakob Kjeldbjerg returns as host as the season marks a return to Malaysia where 21 Danes compete for a chance to win 500,000kr. and be crowned Robinson 2022. The season airs on TV3 premiering on 12 September 2022.

Contestants
Notable cast members includes Majbrit Watt, wife of racecar driver Jason Watt, Doaa Zaher, an Instagram influencer and Loay Zeraiq, who appears in the TV 2 Zulu show, Kørelærerne.

Season Summary

Voting history

Notes

References

External links

Robinson Ekspeditionen seasons
2022 Danish television seasons
Danish reality television series